"Round function" may also refer to rounding.

In topology and in calculus,  a round function is a scalar function ,  
over a manifold , whose critical points form one or several connected components, each homeomorphic to the circle 
, also called critical loops. They are special cases of Morse-Bott functions.

For instance
For example, let  be the torus. Let

Then we know that a map

given by

Now, via the projection 
we get the restriction

 is a function whose critical sets are determined by 

this is if and only if .

These two values for  give the critical sets

which represent two extremal circles over the torus .

Observe that the Hessian for this function  is

which clearly it reveals itself as rank of  equal to one 
at the tagged circles, making the critical point degenerate, that is, showing that the critical points are not isolated.

Round complexity

References
 Siersma and Khimshiasvili, On minimal round functions, Preprint 1118, Department of Mathematics, Utrecht University, 1999, pp. 18.. An update at 

Differential geometry
Geometric topology
Types of functions